Schefflera kontumensis is a species of plant in the family Araliaceae. It is endemic to Vietnam.

References

kontumensis
Endemic flora of Vietnam
Trees of Vietnam
Endangered plants
Taxonomy articles created by Polbot
Plants described in 1975